Dondușeni District is a district (raion) in the north of Moldova. Its administrative center is the city of Dondușeni. As of 2011, its population was 45,100.

History

The earliest attestations historical towns down in 1437 when the district is certified Teleșeuca village. Other localities that Arionești, Corbu, Crișcăuți, Horodiște and Tîrnova are documented during 1463–1470. In the following centuries district towns or developed both socially and culturally. In 1812 the Treaty of Bucharest, Bessarabia is occupied by the Russian Empire as a district for more than 100 years (1812–1918) Russian administration fall. In spring 1888 construction start Bălți–Ocnița railway which ended in 1893. Railway history is closely linked to the city of Dondușeni during the years 1902–1905 the building near the railway station, built in 1892, held the construction of pumping station and water tower, two warehouses for grain and a ramp load, two kilometers of road and three houses. 1918 register a new page in the history of Bessarabia. On 27 March, Sfatul Țării of Bessarabia voted for the Union of Bessarabia with Romania. As a member of the Country's Council vote for Grand Union and Simeon Galiţchi (1887–1940), sergeant major of the infantry regiment of Odessa, a native of Donduşeni and ardent patriot of the Romanian people, who died in summer 1940 as a result of Stalin's Great Purge. Following the pact between Hitler and Stalin from 26 June 1940 the fate of Bessarabia was determined by military force. On 22 June 1941 include the start of 1418 days and nights of fierce and bloody fights between the Germans and Soviets. In this period perplexed more than half the male population was mobilized to Donduşeni station and sent searing flames of war. Eternal remembrance of the 17 men of Donduşeni that victory came at the cost of life. During the 1946–1947 district endure hunger caused by the communists. In 2004 the district population was 47,400.

Geography

Located in the north-eastern part of Moldova with neighboring districts Ocnița District in the north, west Edineţ District, south Rîșcani District, Drochia and Soroca in the southeast. Also has border with Ukraine in the north-east.
Relief of district located on the Plateau of Moldavia is mainly flat with small disturbances in rivers. Erosion has a small intensity. Chernozems occupy 80% of the district. Maximum altitude in the district is located near the village Pocrovca, reaching heights of 247 m.

Climate 
Donduşeni district has a temperate continental climate with an annual average temperature of 9–10 °C in July mean temperature is 20 °C, while in January, 4 °C. Yearly precipitation is 450–600 mm. Wind speed is an average speed of 2–5 m/s.

Fauna 
Fauna of district is typical European with a greater presence of foxes, hedgehogs, badger, wild boar, ferret rarely deer, raccoon dog and spotted deer. Of birds: storks, crow, tits, cop, starlings, swallows and others.

Flora 
Forests occupy 7.7% of district territory and is presented by common oak, hornbeam, linden, maple, of plant: fescue, clover, burdock, wormwood, and many others.

Ţaul Park 
The largest park in Moldova is located in the middle of the village of Ţaul, about 200 km north of Chişinău and 5 km from Donduşeni. Territory whole gully occupies a depression with steep slopes that decrease to the south, and land with mild relief that and all buildings are located above the park. Compositional core and the focus of contemplation is the whole mansion, open park boundaries not only vision but also the village due to the dominant position in the village. To the left of the palace, the exotic trees shade around the lawn and flower gardens with picturesque glade was built box-resorts, hosting house guests, kitchen and group destination auxiliary buildings. The assembly of Taul village bore little change over time and remains a monument of classical characteristic of the early 20th-century residence. The compositions of landscapes and found the most appropriate ideas materialize planning landscape gardens, developed in Europe at the end of the 19th century, and many species of garden is a precious treasure arboretum.

Rivers 
Located in the Nistru river basin district bordering the river only a small portion near the village Arioneşti. The main river crossing the district is Răut (286 km), which takes its origins from the confluence of two streams within 2 km east of the village Rediul Mare, at an altitude of 180 m, with tributaries Cubolta (103 km) and Cainari. Răut is the largest tributary of the Nistru. Most lakes are artificial origin.

Administrative subdivisions
There are a total of 30 localities: 1 city, and 21 communes (containing further 8 villages within):

Cities

Communes

Demographics
1 January 2012 the district population was 44,800 of which 23.9% urban and 76.1% rural population.
Births (2010): 424 (9.4 per 1000)
Deaths (2010): 853 (18.8 per 1000) (highest in Moldova)
Growth rate (2010): -429 (−9.5)

Ethnic groups 

Footnote: * There is an ongoing controversy regarding the ethnic identification of Moldovans and Romanians.

Religion 
Christian – 96.5%
Orthodox Christian – 94.0%
Old Believers – 1.6%
Protestant – 0.9%
Seventh-day Adventists – 0.3%
Pentecostals – 0.3%
Evangelicals – 0.3%
Other – 2.5%
No Religion – 0.8%
Atheists – 0.2%

There is an ongoing controversy over whether Romanians and Moldovans are the same ethnic group, namely whether Moldovans' self-identification constitutes an ethnic group distinct and apart from Romanians or a subset. At the census, citizens could declare only one nationality. Consequently, one could not declare oneself both Moldovan and Romanian.

Economy
As of 2009, 18,311 businesses were registered in the district. Main crops are cereals cultivation in the district: wheat and barley, maize, sugar beet, sunflower, rapeseed and soy.

Education
At of 2009, there were 21 kindergartens in the district. There were 7 lyceums (grades 1–12), 3 secondary schools (grades 1–11), 15 gymnasiums (grades 1–9),
1 primary school (grades 1–4), one or more professional schools (grades 12–13), and one or more boarding schools for orphans.

Politics
Located in the so-called North Red, region where PCRM which usually has good results obtained from 2001 until now over 50% of the vote. But the last three elections the Communists are in constant decline. District is one of the founding members of Euroregion Dniester.

During the last three elections AEI had an increase of 109.6%

Elections

|-
!style="background-color:#E9E9E9" align=center colspan="2" valign=center|Parties and coalitions
!style="background-color:#E9E9E9" align=right|Votes
!style="background-color:#E9E9E9" align=right|%
!style="background-color:#E9E9E9" align=right|+/−
|-
| 
|align=left|Party of Communists of the Republic of Moldova
|align="right"|11,405
|align="right"|54.00
|align="right"|−4.94
|-
| 
|align=left|Liberal Democratic Party of Moldova
|align="right"|4,137
|align="right"|19.59
|align="right"|+9.51
|-
| 
|align=left|Democratic Party of Moldova
|align="right"|3,022
|align="right"|14,31
|align="right"|+0.15
|-
| 
|align=left|Liberal Party
|align="right"|900
|align="right"|4.26
|align="right"|−1.31
|-
|bgcolor=#0033cc|
|align=left|European Action Movement
|align="right"|268
|align="right"|1.27
|align="right"|+1.27
|-
| 
|align=left|Party Alliance Our Moldova
|align="right"|260
|align="right"|1.23
|align="right"|−2.68
|-
| 
|align=left|Christian Democratic People's Party
|align="right"|258
|align="right"|1.22
|align="right"|−2.50
|-
|bgcolor="grey"|
|align=left|Other Party
|align="right"|877
|align="right"|4.12
|align="right"|+0.50
|-
|align=left style="background-color:#E9E9E9" colspan="2"|Total (turnout 65.34%)
|width="30" align="right" style="background-color:#E9E9E9"|21,288
|width="30" align="right" style="background-color:#E9E9E9"|100.00
|width="30" align="right" style="background-color:#E9E9E9"|

Culture
There are 23 public libraries, 22 culture halls, and 1 museum in Donduşeni district. There are also 87 art groups. In recent years several houses were repaired by culture, or open more libraries, especially in villages. Village libraries are equipped with books in large numbers.

Health
There is a hospital with 135 beds, and an outpatient health center with 10 branches, and 10 physician offices. All villages of the district were reading a medical point of 5–6 physicians in the environment.

Personalities
Alexander Gelman – Basarabian playwright, writer, and screenwriter.
Arcadie Gherasim – Journalist (Vocea Basarabiei)
Boris Trakhtenbrot – Israeli and Russian mathematician in mathematical logic, algorithms, theory of computation and cybernetics
Constantin Stere – Politician, lawyer, scholar and writer
Gary Bertini – Israeli conductor
Ion Druta – Poet, Member of the Academy of Sciences of Moldova
Mihai Grecu – Artist, one of the most appreciated in his time by critics and the public
Mihail Șleahtițchi – Minister of Education of Moldova, of 2010

References

 
Districts of Moldova